BG Rock I is a split album by the Bulgarian punk band Kontrol and new wave band Nova Generacia. It was released in 1989, and is the first release in the BG Rock series. The series was produced by Kiril Marichkov, a member of the famous Bulgarian rock band Shturcite. The album was a collaboration between the state label Balkanton and the Dimitrov Young Communist League. 5 LPs were released from 1989 to 1990.

Track list 
Songs 1–6 are by Kontrol. Songs 7-12 are by Nova Generacia.
   (Program)
   (I Love You, Darling)
 100-150
   (Speechless)
   (Liberty)
   (We Didn't Die of Happiness)
 Lovecut na surca (The Heart-Hunter)
 Samo dvama (Only Two)
 Strah (Fear)
 Sueta (Vanity)
 Narcis '88 (Narcissus 1988)
 Ledove (Ice Blocks)

External links 
 BG Rock I at Discogs

1988 albums